is a Japanese swimmer. She competed in the women's 100 metre breaststroke event at the 2017 World Aquatics Championships. She qualified to represent Japan at the 2020 Summer Olympics.

References

External links
 

1995 births
Living people
Universiade medalists in swimming
Asian Games medalists in swimming
Asian Games gold medalists for Japan
Asian Games silver medalists for Japan
Asian Games bronze medalists for Japan
Swimmers at the 2018 Asian Games
Medalists at the 2018 Asian Games
Universiade gold medalists for Japan
Universiade silver medalists for Japan
Japanese female breaststroke swimmers
Medalists at the 2015 Summer Universiade
Medalists at the 2017 Summer Universiade
Swimmers at the 2020 Summer Olympics
Olympic swimmers of Japan
21st-century Japanese women